Teddy Atlas III is an American football scout who served as the assistant director of college scouting of the Las Vegas Raiders.

Early life
Atlas grew up on Staten Island. His father, Teddy Atlas Jr., is a boxing trainer and commentator. Atlas III played football, basketball, and baseball at St. Peter's Boys High School and boxed some in high school and college. He graduated from Northeastern University with a degree in economics.

Football career
Atlas began his career as an intern in the New York Jets scouting department under Eric Mangini. In 2009, Atlas followed Mangini to the Cleveland Browns as a football operations assistant. In 2010 he was moved to the player personnel department. Mangini and his staff were fired after the 2010 season and Atlas was hired by the Oakland Raiders. In 2012 he was promoted to scouting coordinator. In this role, Atlas evaluated talent, coordinated prospect evaluations, worked out free agents, and arranged advanced scouting reports. In 2019 he was promoted to assistant director of college scouting. He was let go by the Raiders in 2022 and became a scout for the NFLPA Collegiate Bowl.

References

Cleveland Browns personnel
Las Vegas Raiders executives
New York Jets personnel
Northeastern University alumni
Oakland Raiders executives
Sportspeople from Staten Island
St. Peter's Boys High School alumni
Living people
Year of birth missing (living people)